The Convicted (German: Die Vorbestraften) is a 1927 German silent drama film directed by Rudolf Meinert and starring Eugen Klöpfer, Margarete Schlegel and Albert Steinrück. The film portrays a group of former prisoners who struggle to reintegrate into society.

Cast
 Eugen Klöpfer - Karl Hartmann 
 Margarete Schlegel   
 Albert Steinrück   
 Arnold Korff   
 Benno von Arent   
 Julius Falkenstein   
 Leopold von Ledebur   
 Hugo Döblin   
 Harry Lamberts-Paulsen   
 Hermann Picha   
 Frida Richard   
 Hedwig Wangel   
 Maria Fein   
 Erich Kaiser-Titz
 Stella Gojo   
 John Mylong
 Arthur Wartan   
 Henri De Vries

References

Bibliography
 Bergfelder, Tim & Bock, Hans-Michael. The Concise Cinegraph: Encyclopedia of German. Berghahn Books, 2009.
 Rosenblum, Warren. Beyond the Prison Gates: Punishment & Welfare in Germany, 1850-1933''. UNC Press Books, 2008.

External links

1927 films
Films of the Weimar Republic
German silent feature films
German drama films
Films directed by Rudolf Meinert
1927 drama films
German black-and-white films
Silent drama films
1920s German films
1920s German-language films